Razini (also Romanized as Razīnī; also known as Razenī) is a village in Solgi Rural District, Khezel District, Nahavand County, Hamadan Province, Iran. At the 2006 census, its population was 3,294, in 806 families.

References 

Populated places in Nahavand County